Douglas Nicholls (born 1956) is a British trade union leader and writer.

Nicholls was a part-time youth worker in Oxford in 1975, when he joined the Community and Youth Workers' Union (CYWU).

He was Secretary of the Coventry Trade Union Council 1984-1994 and the Secretary of the Coventry Miners' Support Committee during the great strike 1984/85.

In 2007, Nicholls took the  into a merger with the Transport and General Workers Union (TGWU); a few months later, the TGWU became part of Unite the Union, and Nicholls served as a national secretary of Unite until 2011.

Nicholls was elected to the Executive of the General Federation of Trade Unions in 1995 and served as its President from 2007 until 2009. He was elected as the Federation's General Secretary in 2012.

He became Chair of the national Chooseyouth campaign in 2011. This is an organisation composed of most youth service related organisations and young people's groups that campaigns for a statutory Youth Service.

In 2015, Nicholls became the first chair of Trade Unionists Against the European Union.

In 2021 he was elected as the first Chair of Rebuild Britain. www.rebuildbritain.org.uk.

Selected book publications

The Dance of Death, with illustrations by Tim Holman. Quatrain poems. 1979.

Speaking Tools, Poems 1975-2005.

Health and Safety in Youth and Community Work.

Managing Violence and Aggression in Youth and Community Work.

Lugalbanda, Lover of the Seed. Version with notes of a Sumerian poem. Manifesto Press.

Editor: Workers' PlayTime, seven scripts from seven struggles. Selected plays about key moments in trade union history with an introduction.

Advisor: For the Many Not the Few, A History of Britain Shaped by the People.

Link contributor: Trade Union Education, Transforming the World.

References

1950s births
Living people
General Secretaries of the General Federation of Trade Unions (UK)
Members of the General Council of the Trades Union Congress
Trade unionists from Oxfordshire
People from Oxford
Presidents of the General Federation of Trade Unions (UK)